The Sex Monster is a 1999 American comedy film written and directed by Mike Binder, produced by Jack Binder and Scott Stephens, and starring Mariel Hemingway and Mike Binder.

Plot 

Martin "Marty" Barnes, a neurotic businessman (director-writer Mike Binder) who works as a building contractor in Los Angeles, tries to improve his sex life with his wife Laura (Mariel Hemingway) by encouraging her to have a threesome involving another woman. Though Marty is fortunate enough to find that Laura likes the idea, he does not count on her decision that she not only has no need of her husband for enjoyment with ladies but also ends up actually preferring them to men. Nor does he anticipate her becoming a sexual tigress who seduces every female she encounters, including even Marty's own secretary.

Cast 
 Mike Binder as Marty Barnes
 Mariel Hemingway as Laura Barnes
 Renée Humphrey as Didi
 Taylor Nicholas as Billy 
 Missy Crider as Diva
 Christopher Lawford as Dave Pembroke
 Joanna Heimbold as Evie Pembroke
 Kevin Pollak as Dr. Jerry Berman
 Stephen Baldwin as Murphy
 Anita Barone as Carol
 Kara Zediker as Ellen 
 Marisol Nichols as Lucia
 Hollland Taylor as Muriel 
 Noah Stone as Danny

External links 
 
 
 

1999 comedy films
1999 LGBT-related films
1999 films
American LGBT-related films
Female bisexuality in film
Films directed by Mike Binder
Lesbian-related films
Trimark Pictures films
LGBT-related comedy films
1990s English-language films
1990s American films